Loess (from  ) is a clastic, predominantly silt-sized sediment that is formed by the accumulation of wind-blown dust. Ten percent of Earth's land area is covered by loess or similar deposits.

Loess is a periglacial or aeolian (windborne) sediment, defined as an accumulation of 20% or less of clay and a balance of roughly equal parts sand and silt (with a typical grain size from 20 to 50 micrometers), often loosely cemented by calcium carbonate. Usually it is homogeneous and highly porous; it is traversed by vertical capillaries which permit the sediment to fracture and form vertical bluffs.

Properties

Loess is homogeneous, porous, friable, pale yellow or buff, slightly coherent, typically non-stratified and often calcareous. Loess grains are angular, with little polishing or rounding, and composed of crystals of quartz, feldspar, mica and other minerals. Loess can be described as a rich, dust-like soil.

Loess deposits may become very thick, more than a hundred meters in areas of Northwestern China and tens of meters in parts of the Midwestern United States. Loess generally occurs as a blanket deposit that covers areas of hundreds of square kilometers. The deposits are often tens of meters thick. Loess often stands in either steep or vertical faces. Because the grains are angular, loess will often stand in banks for many years without slumping. This soil has a characteristic called vertical cleavage which makes it easily excavated to form cave dwellings, a popular method of making human habitations in some parts of China. Loess will erode very readily.

In several areas of the world, loess ridges have formed that are aligned with the prevailing winds during the last glacial maximum. These are called "paha ridges" in America and "greda ridges" in Europe. The form of these loess dunes has been explained by a combination of wind and tundra conditions.

Etymology
The word loess, with connotations of origin by wind-deposited accumulation, came into English from German Löss, which can be traced back to Swiss German and is cognate with the English word loose and the German word los. It was first applied to Rhine River valley loess about 1821.

History of research
The term "Löß" was first described in Central Europe by Karl Cäsar von Leonhard (1823–1824) who reported yellowish brown, silty deposits along the Rhine valley near Heidelberg. Charles Lyell (1834) brought the term into widespread usage observing similarities between loess and loess derivatives along the loess bluffs in the Rhine and Mississippi. At the time it was thought that the yellowish brown silt-rich sediment was of fluvial origin being deposited by the large rivers. It was not until the end of the 19th century that the aeolian origin of loess was recognized (Virlet D'Aoust 1857), especially the convincing observations of loess in China by Ferdinand von Richthofen (1878). A tremendous number of papers have been published since then, focusing on the formation of loess and on loess/paleosol (older soil buried under deposits) sequences as archives of climate and environment change. These water conservation works were carried out extensively in China and the research of loess in China has been continued since 1954. (Liu TS, Loess and the environment)

Much effort was put into the setting up of regional and local loess stratigraphies and their correlation (Kukla 1970, 1975, 1977). But even the chronostratigraphical position of the last interglacial soil correlating to marine isotope substage 5e has been a matter of debate, owing to the lack of robust and reliable numerical dating, as summarized for example in Zöller et al. (1994) and Frechen, Horváth & Gábris (1997) for the Austrian and Hungarian loess stratigraphy,  respectively.

Since the 1980s, thermoluminescence (TL), optically stimulated luminescence (OSL) and infrared stimulated luminescence (IRSL) dating are available providing the possibility for dating the time of loess (dust) deposition, i.e. the time elapsed since the last exposure of the mineral grains to daylight. During the past decade, luminescence dating has significantly improved by new methodological improvements, especially the development of single aliquot regenerative (SAR) protocols (Murray & Wintle 2000) resulting in reliable ages (or age estimates) with an accuracy of up to 5 and 10% for the last glacial record. More recently, luminescence dating has also become a robust dating technique for penultimate and antepenultimate glacial loess (e.g. Thiel et al. 2011, Schmidt et al. 2011) allowing for a reliable correlation of loess/palaeosol sequences for at least the last two interglacial/glacial cycles throughout Europe and the Northern Hemisphere (Frechen 2011). Furthermore, the numerical dating provides the basis for quantitative loess research applying more sophisticated methods to determine and understand high-resolution proxy data including the palaeodust content of the atmosphere, variations of the atmospheric circulation patterns and wind systems, palaeoprecipitation, and palaeotemperature.

Besides luminescence dating methods, the use of radiocarbon dating in loess has increased during the past decades. Advances in methods of analyses, instrumentation, and refinements to the radiocarbon calibration curve have made it possible to obtain reliable ages from loess deposits for the last 40-45 ka. However, the use of this method relies on finding suitable in situ organic material in deposits such as charcoal, seeds, earthworm granules, or snail shells.

Formation

According to Pye (1995), four fundamental requirements are necessary for the formation of loess: a dust source, adequate wind energy to transport the dust, a suitable accumulation area, and a sufficient amount of time.

Periglacial loess
Periglacial (glacial) loess is derived from the floodplains of glacial braided rivers that carried large volumes of glacial meltwater and sediments from the annual melting of continental ice sheets and mountain ice caps during the spring and summer. During the autumn and winter, when melting of the ice sheets and ice caps ceased, the flow of meltwater down these rivers either ceased or was greatly reduced. As a consequence, large parts of the formerly submerged and unvegetated floodplains of these braided rivers dried out and were exposed to the wind. Because the floodplains consist of sediment containing a high content of glacially ground flour-like silt and clay, they were highly susceptible to winnowing of their silts and clays by the wind. Once entrained by the wind, particles were then deposited downwind. The loess deposits found along both sides of the Mississippi River alluvial valley are a classic example of periglacial loess.

During the Quaternary, loess and loess-like sediments were formed in periglacial environments on mid-continental shield areas in Europe and Siberia as well as on the margins of high mountain ranges like in Tajikistan and on semi-arid margins of some lowland deserts as in China.

In England, periglacial loess is also known as brickearth.

Non-glacial
Non-glacial loess can originate from deserts, dune fields, playa lakes, and volcanic ash.

Some types of nonglacial loess are:
 Desert loess produced by aeolian attrition of quartz grains; 
 Volcanic loess in Ecuador and Argentina;
 Tropical loess in Argentina, Brazil and Uruguay;
 Gypsum loess in Spain;
 Trade wind loess in Venezuela and Brazil;
 Anticyclonic loess in Argentina.

The thick Chinese loess deposits are non-glacial loess having been blown in from deserts in northern China. The loess covering the Great Plains of Nebraska, Kansas, and Colorado is considered to be non-glacial desert loess. Non-glacial desert loess is also found in Australia and Africa.

Fertility
Loess tends to develop into very rich soils. Under appropriate climatic conditions it is some of the most agriculturally productive terrain in the world.

Soils underlain by loess tend to be excessively drained. The fine grains weather rapidly due to their large surface area, making soils derived from loess rich. A theory says that the fertility of loess soils is due largely to cation exchange capacity (the ability of plants to absorb nutrients from the soil) and porosity (the air-filled space in the soil). The fertility of loess is not due to organic matter content, which tends to be rather low, unlike tropical soils which derive their fertility almost wholly from organic matter.

Even well managed loess farmland can experience dramatic erosion of well over 2.5 kg /m2 per year. In China the loess deposits which give the Yellow River its color have been farmed and have produced phenomenal yields for over one thousand years. Winds pick up loess particles contributing to the Asian Dust pollution problem. The largest deposit of loess in the United States which is the Loess Hills along the border of Iowa and Nebraska, has survived intensive farming and poor farming practices. For almost 150 years, this loess deposit was farmed with mouldboard ploughs and tilled in the fall, both intensely erosive practices. At times it suffered erosion rates of over 10 kilograms per square meter per year. Today this loess deposit is worked as low till or no till in all areas and is aggressively terraced.

Large areas of loess deposits and soils

Central Asia 
An area of multiple loess deposits spans from southern Tajikistan up to Almaty, Kazakhstan.

East Asia

China
The Loess Plateau, also known as the Huangtu Plateau, is a plateau that covers an area of some 640,000 km2 around the upper and middle reaches of China's Yellow River. The Yellow River was so named because the loess forming its banks gave a yellowish tint to the water. The soil of this region has been called the "most highly erodible soil on earth". The Loess Plateau and its dusty soil cover almost all of Shanxi, Shaanxi, and Gansu provinces; the Ningxia Hui Autonomous Region, and parts of others.

Europe 
Loess deposits of varying thickness (decimeter to several tens of meters) are widely distributed over the European continent. The northern European loess belt stretches from southern England and northern France to Germany, Poland and the southern Ukraine and deposits are characterized by strong influences of periglacial conditions. South-eastern European loess is mainly deposited in plateau-like situations in the Danube basins, likely derived from the Danube River system. In south-western Europe, relocated loess derivatives are mostly restricted to the Ebro Valley and central Spain.

North America

United States

The Loess Hills of Iowa owe their fertility to the prairie topsoils built by 10,000 years of post-glacial accumulation of organic-rich humus as a consequence of a persistent grassland biome. When the valuable A-horizon topsoil is eroded or degraded, the underlying loess soil is infertile, and requires the addition of fertilizer in order to support agriculture.

The loess along the Mississippi River near Vicksburg, Mississippi consists of three layers. The Peoria Loess, Sicily Island Loess, and Crowley's Ridge Loess accumulated at different periods of time during the Pleistocene. Ancient soils, called paleosols, have developed in the top of the Sicily Island Loess and Crowley's Ridge Loess. The lowermost loess, the Crowley's Ridge Loess, accumulated during the late Illinoian Stage. The middle loess, Sicily Island Loess, accumulated during the early Wisconsin Stage. The uppermost loess, the Peoria Loess in which the modern soil has developed, accumulated during the late Wisconsin Stage. Animal remains include terrestrial gastropods and mastodons.

Oceania

New Zealand
Extensive areas of loess occur in New Zealand including the Canterbury Plains and on the Banks Peninsula. The basis of loess stratigraphy was introduced by John Hardcastle in 1890.

South America

Argentina

Much of Argentina is covered by loess. Two areas of loess are usually distinguished in Argentina: the neotropical loess north of latitude 30° S and the pampean loess.

The neotropical loess is made of silt or silty clay. Relative to the pampean loess the neotropical loess is poor in quartz and calcium carbonate. The source region for this loess is thought by some scientists to be areas of fluvio-glacial deposits the Andean foothills formed by the Patagonian Ice Sheet. Other researchers stress the importance of volcanic material in the neotropical loess.

The pampean loess is sandy or made of silty sand.

See also
  – North German loess regions
  – South German loess regions

References
 Attribution
This article incorporates CC-BY-3.0 text from the reference "Loess in Europe: Guest Editorial".

Further reading
 Smalley, I. J. (editor) 1975. Loess Lithology & Genesis. Benchmark Geology 26. Dowden, Hutchinson & Ross 454pp.
 Smalley, I. J. 1980.  Loess: A Partial Bibliography.  Geobooks/Elsevier. . 103pp.
 Rozycki, S. Z. 1991. Loess and Loess-like Deposits. Ossolineum Wroclaw . 187pp.

External links

 2006, The Secret of China’s Vast Loess Plateau Suburban Emergency Management Project, Chicago, Illinois.
 2007, New European Loess Map. Helmholtz Centre for Environmental Research, Leipzig, Germany.
 Glacial Deposits: Loess and Till. Illinois State Museum, Springfield, Illinois.
 Briedis. C.A., 2006, Loess Thickness Map (of Illinois). Illinois State Geological Survey, Champaign, Illinois.
 Heinrich, P.V., 2008, Loess map of Louisiana., Public Information Series. no. 12, Louisiana Geological Survey, Baton Rouge, Louisiana.
 Prior, J.C., and D.J. Quade, nd, The Loess Hills: A Geologic View. Iowa Geological Survey, Department of Natural Resources, Iowa City, Iowa.
 U.S. Geological Survey, 1999, Geology of the Loess Hills, Iowa
 U.S. Geological Survey, 2006, Eolian History of North America Why is loess important to study?
 The Loess Hills of Western Iowa
 The Loess Hills of Roztocze in Poland

Pedology
Glaciology
Sedimentary rocks
Sediments
Types of soil
Aeolian landforms